Sergei Shevchenko is a former Soviet and Ukrainian striker, the champion of Ukraine with SC Tavriya Simferopol, and a Kazakh coach.

Playing career
Born in Kara-Balta, Shevchenko played in the Soviet football leagues before joining Tavriya Simferopol, where he would help the club win the first Ukrainian Premier League title in 1992.

Managing career
He started his managing career at amateur club Avanhard Kramatorsk who won the championship of Donetsk oblast in 1995. In 1996, he was appointed as head coach of Tavriya Simferopol. In 1997–1999 he was coach of FK Andijan and 2000–2002 of Qizilqum Zarafshon. With Qizilqum Zarafshon he won the bronze medals of the 2002 Uzbek League.

In 2011, he moved back to Avanhard Kramatorsk where he started his managing career. After finishing the 2011–12 Ukrainian Second League season his club gained promotion to the Ukrainian First League for the 2012–2013 season. In his first season in the Ukrainian First League, Avanhard finished at 7th position.

On 15 July 2014 he signed a contract with FK Andijan where he worked in 1997–1999.

Honours

Player
Tavriya Simferopol
Ukrainian Premier League (1): 1992

Manager
Qizilqum
Uzbek League 3rd: 2002

TSK Simferopol
Crimean Premier League (1): 2016

References

 Статья "Первый герой новой Украины" на сайте Football.ua 

1960 births
Living people
People from Kara-Balta
Soviet footballers
Ukrainian footballers
Kyrgyzstani footballers
Kyrgyzstani expatriate footballers
SC Tavriya Simferopol players
FC Alay players
FC Alga Bishkek players
FK Neftchi Farg'ona players
FC Metalist Kharkiv players
Ukrainian Premier League players
Ukrainian Premier League managers
FC Kramatorsk managers
SC Tavriya Simferopol managers
FK Andijan managers
FC Ordabasy managers
FC Tytan Armyansk managers
Kyrgyzstani people of Ukrainian descent
Crimean Premier League managers
FC TSK Simferopol managers
Association football forwards
Ukrainian football managers